The Enid Roller Girls (ERG) was a women's flat track roller derby league based in Enid, Oklahoma. Founded in 2010, the league consisted of a single team, which competed against teams from other leagues, and was a member of the Women's Flat Track Derby Association (WFTDA).

History
The league was founded by Jamie Garen, known as "Jme Jawbreaker", after she saw the sport played in Oklahoma City. Enid developed strong links with the Oklahoma Victory Dolls, and by the start of  2011, the squad had twelve skaters and was focusing on finding a permanent venue for training and future bouts. By 2013, it was playing against local rivals such as Oklahoma City Roller Derby, and had skaters from a wide variety of backgrounds.

The league was accepted as a member of the Women's Flat Track Derby Association Apprentice Programme in July 2012, and became a full member of the WFTDA in June 2013.

The team collapsed in November 2019 after many players, such as all-stars Redneck Renegade and Burnout Bandit left the team.

WFTDA rankings

 NR = no end-of-year ranking assigned

References

Enid, Oklahoma
Roller derby leagues established in 2010
Roller derby leagues in Oklahoma
Women's Flat Track Derby Association Division 3
2010 establishments in Oklahoma